Pearl S. Buck House may refer to either of two locations:

 Green Hills Farm, the Bucks County, Pennsylvania location where Pearl S. Buck lived for 40 years
 Pearl S. Buck Birthplace, the Hillsboro, West Virginia home where American writer Pearl S. Buck was born